Gábor Szűcs (born 25 September 1956) is a Hungarian former cyclist. He competed at the 1976 Summer Olympics and the 1980 Summer Olympics.

References

External links
 

1956 births
Living people
Hungarian male cyclists
Olympic cyclists of Hungary
Cyclists at the 1976 Summer Olympics
Cyclists at the 1980 Summer Olympics
Cyclists from Budapest